Ahrenviölfeld is a municipality in Nordfriesland district, in northern Germany.

References

Nordfriesland